Parapachymorpha is a genus of stick insects in the tribe Medaurini, erected by Carl Brunner von Wattenwyl in 1893.  Species have been recorded from: China, Myanmar, Thailand, Cambodia and Vietnam.

Species
The Phasmida Species File lists:
 Parapachymorpha apicalis Ho, 2020
 Parapachymorpha dentata Ho, 2017
 Parapachymorpha granulata Ho, 2021
 Parapachymorpha nigra Brunner von Wattenwyl, 1893 - type species (by subsequent designation)
 Parapachymorpha parvicorne Ho, 2021
 Parapachymorpha spinigera (Brunner von Wattenwyl, 1907)
 Parapachymorpha tridentata Ho, 2020
 Parapachymorpha zomproi Fritzsche & Gitsaga, 2000

Note: Parapachymorpha commelina Thanasinchayakul, 2006 may be a nomen nudum.

References

External links

Phasmatodea genera
Phasmatodea of Asia
Phasmatidae